Palaeacanthaspis vasta is an extinct acanthothoracid placoderm from the early Devonian of Europe.

References

Placoderm genera
Acanthothoracids
Placoderms of Europe
Fossil taxa described in 1934